The Lizard Lifeboat Station can refer to several Royal National Lifeboat Institution lifeboat stations located on the Lizard in Cornwall, United Kingdom. The first was established at the southernmost point of the peninsula in 1859. Since then successive stations have all been in operation at different locations on The Lizard.

The lifeboat stations have all covered the westerly approaches to the English Channel; with up to 400 ships-a-day, it is one of the busiest shipping lanes in the world. The lifeboat service has saved many lives over the past 150 years.

History

Polpeor Cove (1859–1961)

First station
The RNLI established its first lifeboat at the southern tip of The Lizard in 1859. It was inaugurated after the 740-ton steamer, Czar, foundered on the Vrogue Rock, off Bass Point on 22 January 1859. The government transport ship was taking ammunition and uniforms to Malta. Fishing crews from Cadgwith and Church Cove saved some of the crew but the captain and his family drowned. Following the tragedy, a Mrs Agar of Lanhydrock donated money to buy the first Lizard Lifeboat (Anna Maria).

However the location of the first lifeboat station on the cliff above Polpeor Cove was not ideal as it made launches a long and precarious operation in rough sea and weather. On 2 January 1866 the lifeboat broke up after it was launched on exercise during a storm. It was pushed on to rocks causing the death of its Coxswain Peter Mitchell and crew members Richard Harris and Nicholas Stevens. As a tribute to the loss, the RNLI gave £130 to the local lifeboat fund.

Second station

In 1885 a larger station was built above the high-water mark lower down in Polpeor Cove to house a larger lifeboat. The existing smaller craft was moved to a new station at Church Cove just east of Lizard village.

Third station

The final lifeboat station within Polpeor Cove was completed in 1914. The large concrete building had an integrated slipway which meant the lifeboat was able to launch directly into the sea. However this could prove hazardous in rough conditions because of the number of rocks in the cove. The exposed position of the station also meant it required a great deal of expense to maintain its general upkeep.

In order to relaunch the lifeboat, a recovery system was used to haul it back into the boat house. First ropes were places around a natural rock pillar in the sea in order to turn the stern of the boat towards land. A giant wheel – at the rear of the station – was then used to winch the boat back up the slipway.

The result of these difficulties meant the RNLI was forced to spend money repairing the station and the lifeboats from time to time. By 1958, with the need to employ larger and faster lifeboats due to the growth in maritime commerce, the RNLI decided to close Polpeor Cove because of its operating limitations. The RNLI eventually chose Kilcobben Cove as it new location for The Lizard Lifeboat station because it was sufficiently protected to allow safe launches in all conditions. Polpeor Cove closed in 1961.

Cadgwith (1867–1963) 
In 1867 the RNLI placed a second lifeboat at the fishing village of Cadgwith on the east side of the Lizard. This service ran until 1963, when it was finally closed. The station was then integrated with the service at The Lizard's Kilcobben Cove.

Church Cove (1885–1899) 

Church Cove station, which was built at a cost of £300, opened in 1885. It housed the original lifeboat from the first station at Polpeor Cove when that was replaced with a new building and a larger vessel. 

Kilcobben Cove (1961 – present)

First station

Construction was a major civil engineering project because the station and its slipway were built on a cliff just above the waterline. The station, which cost £90,000, was opened on 7 July, 1961 by the Duke of Edinburgh, who also named the new  lifeboat Duke of Cornwall ON952. Due to the steepness of the cliff, a funicular railway carries the lifeboat crew down to the boathouse.

The lifeboat station was originally called The Lizard-Cadgwith Lifeboat Station because it recognised the merging of the two former services based at Polpeor Cove and Cadgwith. This name was officially changed in 1987 to The Lizard Lifeboat Station. In 1988 the station and the slipway required adaptation with the arrival of a  lifeboat called David Robinson ON1145.

Second station
In 2010 the original station was demolished because it could not accommodate the latest  lifeboats. During the rebuilding the lifeboat was kept moored afloat off Cadgwith. On 5 May 2012, the new station was officially opened by Admiral the Lord Boyce, chairman of the RNLI. On the same day, the station's new Tamar-class boat, which had replaced David Robinson the year before, was named Rose in a ceremony by the-then Lord Lieutenant of Cornwall, Lady Mary Holborow.

See also

 List of funicular railways
 List of RNLI stations

References

Lifeboat stations in Cornwall
Lifeboat